Hemicrambe is a genus of flowering plants in the family Brassicaceae.

 Hemicrambe fruticosa (C.C.Towns.) Gómez-Campo – Socotra
 Hemicrambe fruticulosa Webb – Morocco
 Hemicrambe socotrana (A.G.Mill.) Al-Shehbaz – Socotra

References

 
Brassicaceae genera
Taxonomy articles created by Polbot